Ir sult sprechen willekomen is a poem by Walther von der Vogelweide. Thematically, it does neither fully belong to the Minnesang nor to the Sangspruchdichtung, but it commingles both forms.

In the 19th century, the poem was rediscovered by German nationalists and even served as an inspiration for Heinrich Hoffmann von Fallersleben and his "Deutschlandlied".

Since 1973, Alois Kircher's theory that Walther in this poem was repudiating an attack by Peire Vidal, who had denigrated the Germans in his 37th Chanson and had praised Provence as the land "from the Rhône to Vence, and from the sea up to the Durance," has gained general acceptance.

Text

Reinterpretation 
The song "Willkommen" by German band Ougenweide (1976) is based on this poem. The original tune, however, has not been preserved.

Notes

References 
 Alois Kircher: Dichter und Konvention. Zum gesellschaftlichen Realitätsproblem der deutschen Lyrik um 1200 (Literatur in der Gesellschaft 18). Düsseldorf 1973.
 Wolfgang Mohr: Die ‚vrouwe‘ Walthers von der Vogelweide. In: Zeitschrift für Deutsche Philologie 86 (1967).
 Hermann Reichert: Walther von der Vogelweide für Anfänger.  3rd, revised volume. facultas.wuv, Vienna 2009, 

Works by Walther von der Vogelweide
German patriotic songs
Year of song unknown